Bab al-Saghir Cemetery is an Islamic cemetery in Damascus, Syria. It is about 200 meters to the southwest of the Bab al-Saghir gate.

History 
Stephanie Mulder in a book documenting and analyzing medieval Alid shrines in Syria points out that the "tomb [dedicated to Sukayna bint al-Husayn] in the Bab al-Saghir cemetery is consistently mentioned in medieval Arabic sources from the late twelfth century onwards, and the text-based findings relating to its location, original structure, phases of development and various patrons, afford well with the rich architectural evidence documented." The place has notable Islamic interments. The 20th century poet Nizar Qabbani is also buried here.

Interments

Companions of Muhammad 

 Abd Allah ibn Umm Maktum (died 636), early Medinian Muslim
 Asma bint Umays (died 7th century), wife of Abu Bakr, Ali, and Ja'far ibn Abi Talib
 Bilal ibn Rabah (580–640), the first muezzin and secretary of treasure of Medina's Islamic state
 Ubayy ibn Ka'b (died 649), early Medinian Muslim and scribe of Muhammad
 Muawiyah ibn Abi Sufyan, scribe of Muhammad (s) and companion

Alid community 

 Umm Kulthum (627–685/705), Ali and Fatimah's daughter, wife of caliph Umar
 Fatimah al-Sughra (died after 680), daughter of Husayn ibn Ali
 Fidda, the maid of Fatimah
 Kamaid ibn Aswad al-Kindi, a companion of Ali
 Maymunah, daughter of Hasan ibn Ali
 Hameedah, daughter of Muslim ibn Aqil
 Abdullah, son of Zayn al-Abidin

Umayyad caliphs 
 Muawiya I (597, 603 or 605–680), founder and first caliph of the Umayyad Caliphate
 Al-Walid I (674–715), sixth Umayyad caliph

Shrines and Mosques 
Maqam Ru'us Al-Shuhada

Maqam Ru'us ash-Shuhada’, also known as Ganj-e-sarha-e-shuhada’-e-Karbala, or Raous al-Shuhada, the former burial place of the heads of the casualties in Husayn's army at Karbala.  Among them:
 Abbas ibn Ali
 Ali Al-Akbar ibn Husain
 Al-Qasim ibn Hasan
 Al-Hurr ibn Yazid
 Habib ibn Mazahir
Tomb of Muawiya I

Mosque and tomb of Umm Kulthum

Tomb of Bilal

Cenotaphs 

The following tombs are also found within this cemetery, however these are empty graves (cenotaphs) created for the purpose of ziyārah, with the actual graves being at Jannaṫul-Baqī‘ (Classical ), in Medinah, Saudi Arabia:
 Wives of Muhammad:
 Umm Salama Hind bint Abi Umayyah
 Ramlah bint Abi-Sufyan
Hafsa bint Umar
 Abdullah, son of Ja‘far aṭ-Ṭayyâr, and husband and cousin of Zaynab bint Ali
 Abdullah, son of the Sixth Ja`farī Shī`ite Imām, Ja'far as-Sadiq

Other religious significance 
In addition, the area has the well from which the Fourth Shi'ite Imam, Ali Zayn al-Abidin used to perform wuḍú’.

References 

Cemeteries in Syria
Geography of Damascus